I Kill Giants is a 2017 fantasy drama film directed by Anders Walter with a screenplay by Joe Kelly, based on Kelly and Ken Niimura's graphic novel of the same name. The film stars Madison Wolfe, Imogen Poots, Sydney Wade, Rory Jackson, Art Parkinson, Noel Clarke, Jennifer Ehle and Zoe Saldaña.

I Kill Giants had its world premiere at the Toronto International Film Festival on September 9, 2017, and was released in the United States on March 23, 2018, by RLJE Films.

Plot
Barbara Thorson is a young, independent teenager who lives with her brother and supportive older sister Karen. 

Barbara has created a fantasy world inspired by her love of Dungeons & Dragons and the career of former Phillies pitcher Harry Coveleski. Believing that giants from other worlds are coming to attack her hometown, Barbara spends her days crafting weapons and traps to fend off the monsters. In actuality, Barbara's imagination separates her from real world traumas that include her being bullied at school and coping with her mother's terminal illness.
 
One day, Barbara meets Sophia, an exchange from Leeds, England who expresses an interest in getting to know Barbara, but the latter initially remains aloof. While at school, a confrontation between Barbara and a group of bullies is interrupted by her being called by the school psychologist Mrs. Mollé. Mollé herself is unable to communicate with Barbara as she thinks she is a distraction from her fantastical routine.

After school, Barbara explains the mythology behind the giants to Sophia and shows her the baits and traps she creates to lure and trap giants, even presenting a magical "warhammer" inscribed as Coveleski which she keeps in her handbag. She also tells Sophia about Harbingers, ghostly apparitions that warn her whenever there is a nearby giant. After Barbara is given detention by the principal for insulting a teacher, she takes Sophia with her on a hunt for a giant all the while Sophia begins to doubt Barbara's claims.

When Mrs. Mollé learns about Barbara's interest in baseball, her mention of the hobby causes Barbara to become lost in bad memories. In a daze, Barbara is startled by Sophia and accidentally strikes her. Though Barbara tries to apologize, Sophia runs off, upset. 

Sophia is later approached by Taylor, the leader of the bullies, who promises to tell her a secret about Barbara if Sophia will show them some of the "freaky things" she does. Sophia reluctantly agrees, leading Taylor and her friends to the sanctuary, where they proceed to dismantle many of Barbara's traps. Barbara arrives and, armed with Coveleski, proceeds to attack Taylor but the weapon turns out to be a jawbone tied to a stick. Furious, Taylor and her friends viciously beat up Barbara.

A sympathetic Sophia takes Barbara to her home to recover. Barbara wakes and becomes very upset at being brought upstairs, telling Sophia to slowly move away before "it" sees her. Sophia unfortunately looks into one of the rooms and flees the house. A despondent Barbara visits Mollé seeking help but grows more uncomfortable upon being introduced to her family.

After Barbara goes truant for several days, Sophia and Mollé visit her house. In the basement, Sophia discovers a recording of Barbara and her mother telling the story of Coveleski's "Giant Killer" nickname. Sophia finds Barbara, trying to convince her that the giants don't exist, though Barbara shuts out the question of her mother's health and is unable to hear it. Barbara angrily storms off and is visited by Harbingers who taunt her, telling Barbara that she is too weak to defeat a giant.

Barbara heads to face the giant at an abandoned train yard. She hides in the trains but is hunted by the giant, eventually activating a train control station rigged to nearby electrical poles which electrocutes it and sets fire to some of the train cars. Sophia arrives just as Barbara is leaving. The next day, in retaliation for her bullying, Barbara humiliates Taylor by placing a skeleton in her locker, an act which worries Mrs. Mollé and Karen who proceed to look for Barbara. Desperate and in despair, Barbara heads to her sanctuary, where she prays for the return of Coveleski.

As an unexpected storm bears down on the town, Mollé confronts Barbara on her way to the sanctuary, telling her that her mother is desperate to see her but a disillusioned Barbara ignores Mollé. Upon arriving, Barbara witnesses a scene of destruction with Sophia explaining that Taylor wrecked the area as revenge for what Barbara did and that she tried to stop her. 

Suddenly, a titan appears out of the water. Barbara stands against it, and draws forth the restored Coveleski from her handbag, revealing a massive, glowing war hammer. She proceeds to defeat the giant with it, fueled by her wrath that it came for her mother. Lying injured upon the beach, the giant reveals that he came for Barbara, not her mother. Barbara is stunned, and demands that the titan "finish it". 

The giant snatches her up, and draws her close to its head, so she can strike it down with Coveleski. As the giant falls back into the ocean, it brings Barbara with it. Sinking below the waves, she hears the voice of the giant telling her that every living thing must die. It says to run from death is to reject life, and that she must find joy in every moment while she can. Barbara swims back to the beach, where she reunites with Sophia.

The next day, Barbara climbs upstairs to see her mother, who lies dying in her bed. They share heartfelt messages and Barbara apologizes for avoiding her. After the summer break, Barbara's mother dies, but Barbara rekindles her relationships with Mollé, Karen and Sophia. On the night after the funeral, she is awoken by the titan, who stands in the ocean, watching her before she goes back to sleep.

Cast
 Madison Wolfe as Barbara Thorson
 Imogen Poots as Karen Thorson
 Sydney Wade as Sophia
 Rory Jackson as Taylor
 Art Parkinson as Dave
 Zoe Saldaña as Mrs. Mollé
 Noel Clarke as Mr. Mollé
 Jennifer Ehle as Mrs. Thorson
 Ciara O'Callaghan as Theresa Tuzzo
 John Boyle as Titan

Production
On March 23, 2015, it was announced that Joe Kelly and Ken Niimura's graphic novel I Kill Giants was being adapted into a live-action feature film, for which Kelly would write the screenplay. Chris Columbus came on board to produce the film through his 1492 Pictures, along with Ocean Blue Entertainment, Man of Action Studios and XYZ Films. Treehouse would fully finance the film, while XYZ would handle the international sales. Anders Walter would make his feature film directing debut.

On September 11, 2015, Zoe Saldaña and Madison Wolfe joined the film, in which Wolfe would play Barbara, a young misfit girl battling both internal and external monsters in her life, while Saldaña would play Mrs. Mollé, a school psychologist. Wolfe was cast in the film after a search through 500 actors. On September 10, 2016, Imogen Poots was confirmed to star in the film.

Principal photography on the film began on September 27, 2016.

Reception
On review aggregator website Rotten Tomatoes, the film holds an approval rating of 77% based on 62 reviews, and an average rating of 6.63/10. The website's critical consensus reads, "I Kill Giants moody magical realism sometimes slips into the mundane, but impressive CGI and a powerhouse performance by Madison Wolfe pack an unexpected punch." On Metacritic, the film has a weighted average score of 74 out of 100, based on 10 critics, indicating "generally favorable reviews".

See also
 A Monster Calls

References

External links
 
 

2017 films
2010s fantasy drama films
American fantasy drama films
Films based on Image Comics
Films produced by Chris Columbus
1492 Pictures films
Giant monster films
2010s English-language films
2010s American films